Md. Ishak (1 January 1934 – 3 October 2001) Who was known as Md. Ishaq BA. was a Bangladesh Awami League politician. He was elected a member of parliament from Cox's Bazar-2 in 1991.

Early life 
Md. Ishak was born on 1 January 1934 in Cox's Bazar District.

Career 
Ishaq was a politician of Bangladesh Awami League. He was elected to parliament from Cox's Bazar-2 as a BAKSAL candidate in 1991 Bangladeshi general election.

Death 
Md. Ishak died on 3 October 2001.

References 

1934 births
2001 deaths
People from Cox's Bazar District
Awami League politicians
5th Jatiya Sangsad members